Bareppa is a hamlet in west Cornwall, England, United Kingdom, three miles (5 km) southwest of Falmouth. It is in the civil parish of Mawnan.

References

External links

Hamlets in Cornwall
Mawnan